Ice hockey at the 2017 Winter Universiade was held from January 28 through February 8 at Halyk Arena (men's matches) and Baluan Sholak Sports Palace (women's matches) in Almaty. The selection of participating teams - 12 in the men's tournament and seven in the women's tournament, including the hosting Kazakhstan sides in both cases - was announced on July 25, 2016 while the draw to place the teams into their assigned pools took place on September 18, 2016.

Venues

Men

Preliminary round
Twelve participating teams were placed in the following three groups. After playing a round-robin within the group, the teams ranked 1st through 8th overall advanced to the quarterfinals.

Teams received 3 points for a regulation win, 2 points for an overtime/shootout win and 1 point for an overtime/shootout loss. They were then seeded for the playoff round by points per game played, then by goal differential.

All game box scores via wuni2017.sportresult.com

Group A 

All times are local (UTC+6).

Group B 

All times are local (UTC+6).

Group C 

All times are local (UTC+6).

9th–12th placement round
All times are local (UTC+6).

11th place match

9th place match

Playoff round

* denotes shootout victory

All times are local (UTC+6).

Quarterfinals

5th–8th placement matches

7th place match

5th place match

Semifinals

Bronze medal match

Gold medal match

Final standings

Scoring leaders
List shows the top skaters sorted by points, then goals.

GP = Games played; G = Goals; A = Assists; Pts = Points; +/− = Plus/minus; PIM = Penalties in minutes; POS = Position
Source: almaty2017.com

Leading goaltenders
Only the top six goaltenders, based on save percentage, who have played at least 40% of their team's minutes, are included in this list.

TOI = Time on ice (minutes:seconds); SA = Shots against; GA = Goals against; GAA = Goals against average; Sv% = Save percentage; SO = Shutouts
Source: almaty2017.com

Women

Preliminary round

Seven participating teams were placed in the following two groups. After playing a round-robin, the teams ranked first and second in each group advanced to the semifinals.

Teams received 3 points for a regulation win, 2 points for an overtime/shootout win and 1 point for an overtime/shootout loss.

All game box scores via wuni2017.sportresult.com.

Group A

All times are local (UTC+6).

Group B

All times are local (UTC+6).

5th–7th placement round

All times are local (UTC+6).

Playoff round

All times are local (UTC+6).

Semifinals

Bronze medal match

Gold medal match

Final standings

Scoring leaders
List shows the top skaters sorted by points, then goals.

GP = Games played; G = Goals; A = Assists; Pts = Points; +/− = Plus/minus; PIM = Penalties in minutes; POS = Position
Source: almaty2017.com

Leading goaltenders
Only the top five goaltenders, based on save percentage, who have played at least 40% of their team's minutes, are included in this list.

TOI = Time on ice (minutes:seconds); SA = Shots against; GA = Goals against; GAA = Goals against average; Sv% = Save percentage; SO = Shutouts
Source: almaty2017.com

Medalists

Medal table

References

External links
Results book

Ice Hockey
2017
2017
Winter Universiade